The East German rugby union championship was a rugby union competition in the German Democratic Republic, commonly referred to as East Germany. The competition was first held in 1952 and had its last edition in 1990, being terminated by the events of the German reunion.

Competition
The competition was carried out via the DDR Rugby-Oberliga, which consisted of, for a large part of its live time, eight clubs. Below it sat the 2. Liga, the second division.

The competition was carried out in a home-and-away season, a final was not played.

Participating clubs
The number of rugby clubs in East Germany was never large and the Rugby-Oberliga had, at times, even first and reserve teams playing in it. The following clubs played in the league and championship and some stage:
 BSG Stahl Hennigsdorf, now SV Stahl Hennigsdorf Rugby 
 SC DHfK Leipzig, rugby department now part of RC Leipzig 
 ASK Vorwärts Berlin, rugby department defunct
 BSG Lokomotive Wahren Leipzig, rugby department now part of RC Leipzig 
 BSG Stahl Leegebruch, club defunct
 BSG Stahl Brandenburg, rugby department now SG Stahl Brandenburg Rugby 
 BSG Post Berlin, rugby department now RK 03 Berlin 
 Dynamo Potsdam, became Polizei SV Potsdam, club defunct 
 Empor Velten, now Veltener RC
 Ingenieurschule Hennigsdorf, club defunct
 BSG Lok Berlin
 BSG Gastronom Leipzig, rugby department now part of RC Leipzig 
 BSG Lok Falkensee
 Dynamo Dresden, rugby department defunct

Winners
The East German championship was held from 1952 to 1990, with the Stahl Hennigsdorf Rugby as the most successful team, winning 27 championships:.

Winners by number of titles

References

External links
 DRV website  German rugby federation website

 

Championship
Rugby union competitions in Germany
Sports leagues established in 1952
Recurring sporting events disestablished in 1990
1952 establishments in East Germany
Defunct rugby union leagues in Europe
Rugby union